Phaedon cochleariae  (commonly called mustard beetle or watercress beetle) is a species of leaf beetle native to Europe.

References

External links
Images representing Phaedon at BOLD

Chrysomelinae
Beetles described in 1792
Beetles of Europe